The People's Labour Party (PLP) is a political party in Saint Kitts and Nevis led by Timothy Harris. Despite only winning a single seat in the 2015 general elections, Harris became Prime Minister of the country following the elections. The party increased its number of seats in the national assembly to two in the 2020 general elections, with Harris  remaining as Prime Minister.

History
The PLP was established on 17 June 2013 as a breakaway from the Saint Kitts and Nevis Labour Party by former minister Harris and former Deputy Prime Minister Sam Condor. Harris had been sacked from the cabinet earlier in the year, whilst Condor had been fired from his position as Head of Government Business, and had later resigned as Deputy Prime Minister. Harris became the party's leader, with Condor becoming its deputy leader.

Prior to the 2015 general elections, the party joined the Team Unity alliance alongside the People's Action Movement and the Concerned Citizens' Movement. The three parties did not stand candidates against each other, but competed individually against the Saint Kitts and Nevis Labour Party in Saint Kitts and the Nevis Reformation Party in Nevis. The PLP ran in constituencies 3 and 7 in Saint Kitts, with Harris winning constituency 7 and Condor losing in constituency 3.

Election results

References

External links
Official website

Political parties in Saint Kitts and Nevis
Labour parties
Political parties established in 2013
2013 establishments in Saint Kitts and Nevis